The 2022 Okolo Slovenska is the 66th edition of the Okolo Slovenska road cycling stage race. It is being held between 13 and 17 September 2022, as a category 2.1 event on the 2022 UCI Europe Tour.

Teams 
Five of the nineteen UCI WorldTeams, six UCI ProTeams, nine UCI Continental teams, and the Slovakian national team make up the twenty-one teams that are participating in the race.

UCI WorldTeams

 
 
 
 
 

UCI ProTeams

 
 
 
 
 
 

UCI Continental Teams

 
 
 
 
 
 
 
 
 

National Teams

 Slovakia

Route

Stages

Prologue
13 September 2022 — Bratislava,  (ITT)

Stage 1
14 September 2022 — Bratislava to Trnava,

Stage 2
15 September 2022 — Hlohovec to Banská Štiavnica,

Stage 3
16 September 2022 — Detva to Spišská Nová Ves,

Stage 4
17 September 2022 — Levoča to Košice,

Classification leadership table

References

External links 
  

2022
Okolo Slovenska
Okolo Slovenska
Okolo Slovenska